Royal Francs Borains is a football club based in Boussu, Hainaut Province, Belgium. It was founded in 1949 and its home ground is Stade Robert Urbain, which has a capacity of 6,000. The club is affiliated to the Royal Belgian Football Association (KBVB) with matricule 5192 and has green and white as club colours. They compete in the Belgian National Division 1, the third tier in Belgian football.

The club is a continuation of Boussu Dour Borinage, which had matricule 167. Francs Borains, however, compete under matricule 5192 since 2014, which was inherited from the former club Charleroi Fleurus.

History
In 1922, association football club SC de Boussu-Bois was founded in Boussu; it was assigned matricule 167 when these were introduced to Belgian football in 1926. Boussu-Bois occasionally played in the national divisions. In the 1980s, after a merger, the name was changed to R. Francs Borains. In 2008, the name was changed to Boussu Dour Borinage. However, the club experienced financial difficulties in the following years and struggled to obtain a license.

In 2014, Boussu Dour was approached by RFC Sérésien, a club competing in the Liège First Provincial League with matricule 23, which had been acquired by French Ligue 2 club Metz. Sérésien had ambitions to climb up the divisions, and were looking to take over a matricule from a club in the higher divisions in order to obtain a licence a few level higher. Boussu Dour were willing to transfer their matricule 167, provided that they themselves found a higher division matricule in order to maintain their youth setup. They eventually found one through Roberto Leone, who was the owner of matricule 5192 of Charleroi Fleurus in the Belgian Third Division and of matricule 94 of FC Charleroi in the Belgian First Amateur Division. Both matricules were involved in multiple mergers in those years, before becoming RAAL La Louvière in 2017. 

Leone wanted to withdraw from football and sold his matricules. He came to an agreement with Boussu Dour Borinage, who would take over matricule 5192 and thus also retained its national youth setup. Matricule 94 would house a new club in the region around Charleroi which became aforementioned RAAL La Louvière, and administratively merge with the superfluous matricule 23 of RFC Sérésien to obtain their national youth setup. Boussu Dour left their former matricule 167 to Seraing.

Boussu Dour under the new matricule 5192 took the old name Francs Borains. Since matricule 5192 as Charleroi Fleurus had just been relegated, Francs Borains started in the Belgian Fourth Division in 2014. The club immediately finished second in Fourth Division and thus qualified for promotion play-offs, but lost in the first round after penalties against City Pirates. In their second season, the club finished twelfth and moved to the Belgian Third Amateur Division due to the reforms of Belgian football. In the first season, they finished third, one point of champions RWDM, but lost in the final round to Mormont. The following season, however, the club did achieve success in the final round by beating Tournai and Jeunesse Aischoise.

In early 2020, it was announced that Francs Borains had entered into talks with Royal Albert Quévy-Mons, the continuation of RAEC Mons. However, a merger with the aim of forming a major football club from the Mons region and Borinage was met with protests from both supporters of Francs Borains and those of Mons. Plans of a merger were at an advanced stage, but on 11 April 2020, Francs Borains withdrew from negotiations.

Incidentally, 2020 was a special year for Francs Borains from a sporting point of view. Due to the COVID-19 pandemic, the KBVB decided on 27 March 2020 to stop all competitions and to determine the final ranking. The club from the Borinage played 24 games in the Belgian Second Amateur Division and finished top of the league with 52 points, which meant promotion to Belgian First Amateur Division.

On 24 April 2020, Reformist Movement president Georges-Louis Bouchez was appointed chairman of Francs Borains.

Current squad

References

External links
  

Association football clubs established in 1949
1949 establishments in Belgium
Organisations based in Belgium with royal patronage
Football clubs in Belgium